The Wieambilla police shootings was a religiously motivated terrorist attack that involved the killing of police constables Matthew Arnold and Rachel McCrow, and neighbour Alan Dare, at a rural property in Wieambilla, a locality in Queensland, Australia on 12 December 2022. Three residents, brothers Gareth and Nathaniel Train, and Gareth's wife, Stacey Train, were subsequently shot and killed by responding police. The shootings were labelled as Australia's first fundamentalist Christian terrorist attack.

Background
The Queensland Police Service was asked by the New South Wales Police Force to conduct a check at the Wieambilla property, owned by Gareth Train and his wife Stacey, as part of an ongoing missing person case. New South Wales police reported that Gareth's brother Nathaniel Train, the former principal of Walgett Community College Primary School and Yorkeys Knob State School, had not made contact since 9 October, and police were sent to conduct a welfare check as well as to follow up a warrant related to a December 2021 weapons dumping and a state border breach. Nathaniel's estranged second wife, who had lodged the missing person report on 4 December, had subsequently been inundated with threatening and vicious messages from Gareth.

Gareth Train was an active participant in Australian conspiracy theory forums and websites: he had espoused strong anti-government, anti-police and anti-vaccine views, and supported the sovereign citizen movement. The father of Gareth and Nathaniel, Pastor Ronald Train, said in an interview on A Current Affair that "Gareth in particular was obsessed with guns and weapons, Nathaniel to a lesser degree", and that Gareth was a difficult child who was "very volatile [and] very controlling".

Gareth was a known online conspiracy theorist who claimed the Port Arthur massacre was a false flag operation and that Princess Diana was killed in a "blood sacrifice". Both Nathaniel and Gareth had a dislike for police. Nathaniel was previously married to Stacey. Stacey and Nathaniel were former teachers, having resigned in 2020 and 2021 respectively.

Incident
The two groups met at the locked entrance to the property at about 4:30p.m. and after receiving no response jumped the fence and approached the residence.

Residents then shot at the police in what was described as an ambush and an execution. Constables Rachel McCrow and Matthew Arnold were wounded and then fatally shot again at close range, and had their weapons taken. The two remaining police, one of whom was wounded by glass fragments (and later hospitalised), escaped to raise the alarm. The perpetrators then lit a grass fire to try to locate an officer who had hidden there. A neighbour, Alan Dare, investigating the grass fire, was fatally shot in the back. Following the murders, Gareth and Stacey posted an online video under their middle names, Daniel and Jane. Gareth said "they came to kill us and we killed them", referring to police as "devils and demons".

A six-hour siege followed, with 16 specialist police officers from the Special Emergency Response Team (SERT) and a police helicopter responding to the incident. Shortly after 10:30p.m., SERT officers breached the property and fatally shot all of the alleged perpetrators: Nathaniel, Gareth and Stacey Train.

On 18 December, police charged two men with unlawful trespass and stealing by looting on the Trains' property.

Victims
Arnold was aged 26, McCrow was aged 29, and Dare was aged 58. The two officers who survived, Constable Randall Kirk and Constable Keely Brough, were both aged 28 at the time of the shooting. Both Kirk and Brough were taken to hospital. Kirk underwent surgery to remove shrapnel and treat the injuries he suffered during the incident.

Arnold had been sworn in as a police officer in March 2020, McCrow in June 2021.

McCrow and Arnold were bestowed the National Police Service Medal, National Medal, Queensland Police Service Medal, and Queensland Police Valour Medal during their memorial service held at the Brisbane Entertainment Centre on 21 December 2022.

The Queensland Police Service announced it would be awarding Dare a posthumous Queensland Police Bravery Medal. His funeral was held on 23 December.

Reactions
Prime Minister Anthony Albanese paid tribute to the victims, labelling it a "devastating day" for the local community and for Queensland Police. Other federal party leaders, including Opposition Leader Peter Dutton, Nationals leader David Littleproud and Greens leader Adam Bandt, paid their respects. Dutton, a former Queensland police officer, became emotional during a condolence motion in parliament.

Queensland Premier Annastacia Palaszczuk announced that buildings across the state including Brisbane's Story Bridge would light up in blue and white to honour the victims and state flags would be lowered to half-mast.

New South Wales Premier Dominic Perrottet paid his respects at a police memorial and announced on 14 December that the Sydney Opera House would be lit up in blue that night in honour of the police officers.

The Australian Federal Police and the New Zealand Police sent their condolences, as did the Queensland Police Union which subsequently announced plans to purchase the property, to serve as a memorial for the fallen officers and to prevent the site from "falling into the wrong hands".

Investigation
In February 2023, Deputy Police Commissioner Tracy Linford said that "We [Queensland Police] don't believe this attack was random or spontaneous" and that "There is absolutely no evidence at this time that there is anyone else in Australia that participated or assisted in this attack." Linford further stated that the Trains were religious extremists who subscribed to "a broad Christian fundamentalist belief system known as premillennialism."

See also

 Timeline of major crimes in Australia
 Walsh Street police shootings
 Silk–Miller police murders

References

2022 murders in Australia
2022 mass shootings in Oceania
2020s mass shootings in Australia
2020s in Queensland
Australian police officers killed in the line of duty
December 2022 events in Australia
Murder in Queensland
Mass shootings in Australia
Crimes committed against law enforcement
Queensland Police Service
Incidents involving the sovereign citizen movement
Terrorist incidents in Australia
Terrorist incidents in Australia in the 2020s
Far-right terrorism
Christian terrorism in Australia
Premillennialism